The Nassau Open was a golf tournament on the PGA Tour from 1934 to 1937. It was inaugurated as the British Colonial Open, and was played at the Bahamas Golf Club in Nassau, in The Bahamas. Having been rescheduled, the fifth edition of the tournament was then cancelled shortly before it was due to be staged in January 1939.

The winner of the final event was Sam Snead.

Winners

References

Former PGA Tour events
Golf tournaments in the Bahamas
Sport in Nassau, Bahamas
Recurring sporting events established in 1934
Recurring sporting events established in 1939